The Jewish name has historically varied, encompassing throughout the centuries several different traditions.  This article looks at the onomastics practices of the Jewish people, that is, the history of the origin and forms of proper names.

History

Early Biblical Era

The name conferred upon a person in early Biblical times was generally connected with some circumstance of that person's birth—several of Jacob's sons are recorded as having received their names in this manner (Genesis 30). Generally, it was the mother who chose the name, as in the case of Jacob's sons, but there were occasions on which the father chose the child's name, such as in Genesis 16:15, 17:19, and 21:2.  Occasionally, persons other than the parents were the name-givers, as in the cases of Moses (Exodus 2:10) and Solomon (II Samuel 12:25).

It appears to have been the custom in early Biblical times to confer a name immediately upon birth, but in later periods a name was given to a boy at circumcision (compare Luke 1:59 to 2:21). Before the Babylonian exile, it was not common practice to name children after their relatives, even in the royal family—none of the twenty-one kings of Judah was named after a predecessor, or after David, the founder of the dynasty. On the other hand, a son of Jonathan and of King Saul were each named Meribaal (II Samuel 21:7 and following). Instead of repeating the exact name of an ancestor, however, it was customary to make use of one of the elements of the family name. Thus, Ahitub has two sons, Ahijah and Ahimelech. Three of Saul's family members have the element ba'al (in the altered form bosheth) in their names. As a consequence of this avoidance of repetition, a single name was as a rule sufficient to identify a person. It became traditional to identify a son by his father's name and a chosen name, like Jaazaniah ben Shaphan (Ezekiel 8:11) only in later years of Hebrew history.

Significance

It is probable that, as in other ancient societies, a name carried spiritual significance. A large majority of the 2,800 personal names found in the Hebrew Bible (shared among about 15,000 persons) convey a specific meaning. The meanings of the remainder have been obscured either through textual corruption or insufficient current understanding of comparative philology.  In addition, a considerable number of these names are probably eponyms. There is little doubt that this applies to the names of the Israelite clans, each of which was assumed to be descended from the descendants of Jacob, described in Numbers 26.

Names may be derived from the order of birth, as in the cases of Akkub and Jacob, whose names probably mean "posthumous."  Jephthah implies "first-born", as does Becher, while names like Manasseh, Nahum, and Nehemiah refer probably to children who have come to take the place of others that have died in childhood. The idea of relationship is expressed in Ahab, probably originally Ahiab (Jeremiah 29:21).

Personal peculiarities may give rise to a name, as Laban ("white", or "blond"), Gideon ("maimed"), or Harim ("with pierced nose"). Personality may be referred to, as in the names Job ("assailant") and Barak ("lightning"). There are no occupational names in the Bible corresponding to Anglo-Saxon names like Smith of England or Müller of Germany, but names taken from objects are found, especially among females. The name Rebecca (Rivka) seems to be derived from a sheep-rope, Peninnah from pearl, and Keren-happuch from a box of face-paint. Abstract names seem to have been given primarily to women, such as Manoah ("rest") and Michal ("power").

Jacobs gives eighty-four names (applied to 120 different persons) derived from animals and plants. Leah is generally known as a word for cow, and Rachel for ewe (appropriate since both are considered matriarchs). Oreb ("raven") and Ze'ev ("wolf") were princes of the Midianites (although Ze'ev was also an appellation of Benjamin), and Caleb ("the dog") was the founder of the chief Judean tribe. Achbor ("mouse") and Shaphan ("coney") also occur. Jonah is the equivalent of "dove", Zipporah of "bird", and Deborah of "bee."  Esther's Jewish name, Hadassah, means "myrtle."  Citing these animal-inspired names, Robertson Smith and others have attempted to find evidence of totemism among the ancient Hebrews.

Other Jewish names taken from animals include Ari (lion), Ariel means ("God is my lion"), Dov (bear), and Tzvi or Zvi (gazelle).

Compound names

A distinctive characteristic of Bible onomastics is the frequency of composite names, which form at times even complete sentences, as in the case of Isaiah's son Shear-jashub ("the remnant shall return") and Hephzibah ("my pleasure is in her"). Sometimes these composites have a preposition as their first element, as Bishlam (= "with peace"; Ezra 4:7) and Lemuel ("belonging to God"; Proverbs 31:4); but in the majority of cases these composite names are theophorous, referring to, or actually mentioning, the Deity, either by the name of YHWH or by the name of El. The specific name of the Hebrew God appears at the beginning as Jo- and at the end as -iah; thus, Jonathan is a doublet of Elnathan, and Joezer ("YHWH is help") is the same as Joazar ("YHWH has helped"). A whole theology may be deduced from the large number of Biblical names referring to acts, actions, and attributes of the deity; thus: YHWH "gives" (Elnathan, Jonathan, Nathaniel); "increases the family" (Eliasaph, Joseph); "is gracious" (Elhanan, Hananeel, John, Hananiah); "has mercy" (Jerahmeel); "blesses" (Barachel, Berechiah); "loves" (Jedidiah, Eldad); "helps" (Eleazar, Azareel, Azariah); "benefits" (Gamaliel); "holds fast" (Jehoahaz, Ahaziah); "is strong" (Uzziel, Azaziah, Uzziah); "delivers" (Elpalet, Eliphalet); "comforts" (Nehemiah); "heals" (Rephael); "conceals" (Elzaphan, Zephaniah); "establishes" (Eliakim, Jehoiakim); "knows" (Eliada, Jehoiada); "remembers" (Zechariah); "sees" (Hazael, Jahaziel); "hears" (Elishama, Hoshama); "answers" (Anaiah, Ananiah, Janai); "speaks" (Amariah); "is praised" (Jehaleel); "is asked" (Shealtiel); "comes" (Eliathah); "lives" (Jehiel); "exalts/uplifts" (Jeremiah); "thunders" (Raamiah; Nehemiah 7:7); "gladdens" (Jahdiel, Jehdeiah); "judges" (Elishaphat, Jehoshaphat, Shephatiah, Daniel); "is just" (Jehozadak, Zedekiah); "is king" (Elimelech, Malchiel); "is lord" (Bealiah); "is great" (Gedaliah); "is perfect" (Jotham); "is high" (Jehoram); "is glorious" (Jochebed); "is incomparable" (Michael, literally "who is like God?")

Besides these distinct names of God other divine names are used, as Adoni in Adoniram, and Melech in Nathan-melech and Ebed-melech, and Baal in Esh-baal (changed for special reasons to Ishbosheth). In some cases names of relationship seem to be used as applied to the Deity (compare Abiel, Abijah, and Abimelech, signifying in each case the fatherhood of God), and in this way Abinadab would correspond to Jehonadab and Abiezer to Eliezer. The same applies to the elements aḥ- ("brother") and amm- ("uncle"). As, however, some of these words are applied to families, not individuals, the whole must be taken as a sentence: Avihud means "my father is glorious" (referring to God). On the same principle it must be assumed that some verbal names are theophorous, and refer to the action of the Deity, Nathan being the abbreviation of Elnathan ("God gives"), Shaphat of Jehoshaphat ("God judges"). Thus Ahaz appears in a form corresponding to Jehoahaz in an inscription of Tiglath-Pileser III. Many of the theophorous endings are contracted into -a, -i, or -ai, as in Shebna, Hosa, Talti, and Shemai. A few names are adjectival, and may contain references to the Deity: Baruch ("blessed"), David ("beloved"), Amos ("strong"). Some names have grammatical endings which it is difficult to interpret, as -oth in Shelomoth; the final -i in Omri and Barzilai probably refers to a tribal origin. Many names ending in -on are animal-names, as Ephron ("small deer"), Nahshon ("small serpent"); compare Samson ("small sun").

Post-Exilic names

After the Exile to Babylon there appeared a tendency toward the use of foreign names, the literal significance of which was disregarded, and this tendency became more and more prominent as time went on. Biblical names ending in -a (as in the books of Ezra and Nehemiah) are Aramaic. Shamsherai (I Chronicles 8:26), while Mordecai is probably derived from Marduk, or may be derived from "pure myrrh"), as are Belteshazzar (Daniel 10:1), Shenazar (I Chronicles 3:18), and Sheshbazzar (Ezra 1:8) from other deities. There is in this period a tendency also toward descriptive and adjectival names with the definite article prefixed, which easily gave rise to such surnames as Hakkaz, Hakkatan, and Hallosheth (Ezra 2:61; 8:12; Nehemiah 3:12; compare the form ha-Kohelet (Ecclesiastes 12:8, in the Hebrew). In the Hellenistic period Greek names became quite usual among the Jews, especially those of Alexander, Jason, and Antigonus. Even the name of a god like Apollo occurs (Acts 18:24). Other names are Apollonius, Hyrcanus, Lysimachus, Demetrius, Dosa, Nicanor, Pappus, Patroclus, Philo, Sosa, Symmachus, Tryphon, Zeno. The same occurs among women, as Alexandra and Priscilla. Roman names also occur, as Antonius, Apella, Drusus, Justinus, Justus, Marcus, Rufus, Tiberius, and Titus. It was during this period that the practice arose of giving a son the name of his grandfather, as was done in the high-priestly family, the members of which were named alternately Onias and Simon from 332 to 165 BCE. Similarly, a little later, in the family of the Hillelites, the names Gamaliel and Judah succeed each other with only an occasional occurrence of Simon and Hillel. Toward the end of the period, owing to the intermixture of foreign languages, the use of double names for the same person began to be adopted, as in the instances of Simon Peter, John Mark, Thomas Didymus, Herodes Agrippa, and Salome Alexandra.

Talmudic period
Among the names in the Talmud there is a considerable proportion of Greek ones. A large number also are Aramaic, ending in -a or -ai: Abba, Huna, and Papa are instances of the former. Even Bible names were transformed in this direction——Ḥanina instead of Hananiah, Abuya instead of Abijah; while others were shortened, as Lazar (for Eleazar). Many Biblical names received renewed popularity owing to the distinction of their bearers, as those of Gamaliel, Hillel, and Ulla. The tendency toward double names existed here, as Sarah Miriam, Johanan Joseph, and Mahaliel Judah. Converts to Judaism, like Aquila, Monabaz, and Helena, retained their pagan names (as was the custom also in the early Christian Church). There was some objection to foreign names among the Jews of this period, yet legend declares that the high priest Simon promised Alexander the Great that all the children of priestly families born in the year following his visit to Jerusalem would be named Alexander, after him.

In the adoption of double names during this early period an attempt was made to translate the Hebrew terms into corresponding Greek, as Ariston for Tobi, Boethus for Ezra, Justus for Zadok, Philo for Jedidah, Theodorus for Nethaneel, and Zosimus for Ḥayyim.

It was somewhat rare for the same name to be used by both sexes. In Biblical times this occurs with regard to the names Abigail, Abijah, Athaliah, Chushan, Ephah, Micha, Nahash, Shelomith, Zibiah; in Talmudic times, with regard to Ibu, Johanan, Nehorai, Pasi, Shalom; the only later instances that may be cited are Jeroham, Mazal-Ṭob, Neḥamah, Menuḥah, Simḥah, Tamar, Bongodas, and Bien-li-Viengue. To wear a man's name seemed as objectionable as wearing men's clothes.

It was already noticed in Talmudic times that the use of family names had died out. The name of Rabbi Meir was said to be derived from an experience at school which was regarded as being of good omen. It is recommended not to name a child after enemies of the Jews, like Sisera and Pharaoh, but to use the names of the Patriarchs (i.e. Abraham, Isaac, and Jacob).

Post-Talmudic period
As the Jews spread throughout the lands bordering the Mediterranean, they drew upon other languages for their personal names while still retaining Biblical ones, and they were especially prone to adopt names ending in -el. These new names became exceptionally popular in Italy. To this source must be traced the new name Ḥushiel, composed on the same plan as the Biblical ones ending in -el. The kings of the Khazars, so far as their names are known, wavered between pure Biblical names, like Obadiah, and local names, like Bulan. The Karaites in the same neighborhood adopted Tatar names, one of them being known as Toktamish; but elsewhere Karaite names are mostly Arabic and Persian.

The custom of calling one of the sons, generally the eldest, after the paternal (sometimes the maternal) grandfather, of which only nine instances are known during the Talmudic period, became more popular, especially in European states. Maimonides' grandfather was Joseph ben Isaac ben Joseph ben Obadiah ben Solomon ben Obadiah, for instance, and certain families seem to have similarly confined themselves to a few chosen names. Thus, in the Kalonymus family there occurs Meshullam b. Moses b. Ithiel b. Moses b. Kalonymus b. Meshullam b. Kalonymus b. Moses b. Kalonymus b. Jekuthiel b. Moses b. Meshullam b. Ithiel b. Meshullam—only five names among fourteen persons throughout three centuries. As a consequence certain names became characteristic of certain districts: Japheth and Caleb in Greece, and hence among the Karaites; Kalonymus in south Italy; Sheshet and Joab in Rome; Sinai and Pesaḥ in Germany. Some of the older names were revived—Meïr, for example, of which only two previous instances before, had been known, the tanna Meïr and the Meïr mentioned by Josephus. Samson was never used by Jews before the 11th century.

Kinnuyim

The most striking tendency of the post-Talmudic period is the general choice of local names by the Jews for their civic relations. This led to the adoption of two names, one for civic purposes, known as the kinnuy (probably from the Arabic kunyah), the other (shem ha-ḳodesh) for use in the synagogue and in all Hebrew documents. The latter, the "sacred" name, was as far as possible associated with the former, and was often a translation of a civic one, e.g., Asael for Diofatto, Manoah for Tranquillo, Ḥayyim for Vita; at times the civic name was merely a contraction of the sacred one, e.g., Leser for Eliezer, Sender for Alexander. In other cases mere similarity in sound was sufficient to determine the sacred name, as Mann for Menahem, Kalman for Kalonymus, and the like. Especially noteworthy was the use made of Jacob's blessing to transfer a personal name from the civic to the sacred sphere. Judah being compared to a lion's whelp in Jacob's blessing, Judah became Leo, or Löwe, in lay relationship, and Ephraim became Fischlin. Later on these name-equations became so usual that they formed doublets, which were almost invariably found together, as Dov Bär, Naphtali Hirsch, Solomon Zalman, Judah or Aryeh Löb, Binyamin Wolf, and these again gave currency to similar correlative names, as Uri Phoebus.

Titular abbreviations

It was during the Middle Ages that the somewhat curious custom arose of combining the abbreviation of a title with the initials of a name to form a single personal name. This almost invariably implies frequency of mention, and, therefore, celebrity. The best-known examples are those of RaSHI and RaMBaM, who are hardly ever quoted in rabbinical texts except by these names, but there are many similar contractions.

A somewhat similar use of a title is the combination with Messer, as in the Italian Messer Leon, while in Provence the honorary prefixes en-, for men, and na-, for women, are combined with the name to form Engusek (En-Joseph), Nabona, etc.

Apart from these tendencies, the general trend of nomenclature among Jews in the Middle Ages was to adopt that of the countries in which they lived, the given names being often identical with those of the surrounding peoples, and other means of identification being derived mainly from localities or offices. Certain peculiarities of various countries may be taken separately.

Mizrahim

Among the Mizrahim (Arabic-speaking Jews living in Western Asia and North Africa) it was quite common to replace their Hebrew names with relevant Arabic ones, whenever they bore a religious note and were deemed sacred to both Jews and Muslims, so Abraham turned into Ibrahim, Aharon into Haroun, David into Daoud, Moshe into Moussa, and Shlomo into Soliman or Salman.

The indication of a family's elevated religious status, which also gained its members the reverence of their non-Jewish neighbors, was expressed in Arabic through their name. One has to note that such names were often given by the surrounding non-Jewish communities, who confused the appropriate religious terms of the Halakhah. An example of this is the name Nader, which is the Arabic translation of Nazir: the Hebrew root word neizer (pronounced nay-zeer) means delineation or designation, and refers to the status of nezirut in which a person makes a vow to isolate himself from certain matters, such as intoxicating beverages, and other material luxuries (the absence of which would deaden his cravings for physical pleasures, as well as enhance his spiritual sensitivity and further his quest to attain spiritual heightenings), as well as things that are considered being tamea (spiritually unclean, such as corpses). Yet in the Arabic environment a family of Cohanim (descendants of Aaron and priests of the Beit haMiqdash), would often be described as such through the name Nazir, or Nader. The obvious reason behind the wrong usage of the term Nazir and its attribution to Cohanim, is the fact that the Mizrahi Cohanim had always strictly adhered to the relevant Halachic Laws which entail that they avoid coming into contact with corpses, lest they lose their status of purity, and which is similar to the rules that govern the status of nazarites, as well as their perception amongst their surrounding Arab neighbors, especially the Coptic Christians, as being consecrated (vowed) to the religious service of the Beit haMiqdash.

Personal peculiarities also gave rise to a Jew's name in the Arab world, as Abyad referred to fair skin, Afia possessor of strength, health or well-being, Tawil to a tall person.

It was also quite usual that Hebrew names were translated into their corresponding meaning in the Arabic language, such as Adin into Latif, or Loutfi, Eleazar into Mansour, Gershom into Ghareeb, Mazliach into Maimun, Sameah into Said, and Tovia into Hassan, or Hassoun.

Common segments of Mizrahi society adopted local Arabic names, such as Abdallah, Abdela, Abdo and Aboudi (all meaning servant of the Lord), Farag (relief), Massoud (fortunate), Mourad (aspired to), Nessim (fresh breeze), Sabah (morning), Sahl (ease), Salama, Salem and Selim (all meaning unharmed), Zaki (well-smelling), because of their beautiful meanings, or the good fortune they seemed to evoke.

As had been the case within the Ashkenazi (Central and East European Jewish) cultural environment, Mizrahim bore names that related to their trades and occupations, such as Albaz (also Elbaz, Elvas meaning falconer), Aboutboul (Abitbol, Abiteboul, Abutbul, Botbol all meaning drummer, drum maker, or seller), Hayek and Khayat (which both mean tailor), Hakim (physician, or sage), Naggar (carpenter), Sabbagh (dyer of cloth), Sabban (soap maker), Sannoua (labourer), Sarrouf or assaraf (money changer), Shenhav (also Chenhav, Shenhavy, Chenhavy) all referring to ivory and mean ivory craftsman or trader. Yemenite Jewish names were often adopted by place names such as Tzanani (from Sana'a), Taeizi (from Taiz), Harazi (from Jabal Haraz), and Damari (from Dhamar). Other family names indicate pre-Islamic Jewish origin such as Kahalani (Kahlan) and Chorath (Bnei Chorath). Additionally, some Yemenite Jewish was related to their occupation such as Tabib/Taviv (doctor) and Qafih (poet).

Mizrahim sought to avert the ein ha raa (evil eye) and envy by never calling the dearest of their children (especially, the firstborn son) by the real name. In their quest to protect a child, parents would even revert to such drastic measures as giving it a very unattractive nickname, such as Garboua (the one who is clad in rags), which has later become a family name.

Contrary to Ashkenazim, the Mizrahim applied the rulings of Talmud Shabbat 134, which provides that a child be called after a living relative. This led to the creation of another Mizrahi particularity, where a child could be named Sarah bat Sarah, or Abraham ben Abraham, which as per Ashkenazi customs, would only have been applied to a ger (gerim being convertites to Judaism, and thus, deemed having become bnai brith, that is to say children of the Covenant, holding the status of children of the Patriarch Abraham and the Matriarch Sarah).

Name giving also served as a social welfare tool, whereby poor parents sought to secure the support of a benefactor for their child, by naming him after a wealthy relative or employer, who would show his acceptance to look after the welfare of the child by presenting it with a first set of clothing, and later on support him with marriage expenses and the like.

The Mizrahim also reverted to this measure, as a means to strengthening the family ties between a married woman and her blood relatives, whereby a newly born child would be named after the elder of the mother's family, or one of its notables, and thus, retain his material benevolence, as well as underline the husband's expressed will to align himself to his spouse's family and gain their goodwill, or at least not to estrange his wife from her roots.

A peculiarity of the Arabic onomatology is the kunyah, the by-name given to a father after the birth of his son, by which he is named after the latter (Abou, Abo, or Abu followed by the name of his son). It may be added here that Abu al-Walid is a kunyah or by-name for Jonah. Abu also forms family names, as in the case of Abudarham, or Aboab. Here it has to be noted, that the word Abou was sometimes used in the sense of "owner", especially when it was followed by an object that was of importance to the manner in which the surrounding community perceived the person in question. The most prominent example for this is Abou Hassira (owner of a straw mat), a descendant of a long line of kabbalists and pietists from Morocco (born 1807 in Morocco, died 1880 in Egypt, buried in the village of Demitiouh, near Damanhour, in the Governorate of Beheira), whose real name Yaccov Ben Massoud has almost been forgotten, as he has become identified as Rabbi Abou Hassira since his pilgrimage from his homeland to Jerusalem, during which the boat he was on sank, yet he was miraculously saved because he hung on to his straw mat (hassira), which had been his only possession. For this the Egyptian population venerated him from that day on as a holy man and miracle worker, whose life had been protected by the Lord through a frail mat.

Akin to this is the use of the Arabic Ibn which is relaten to Hebraic ben like in benjamin or ben yamin, (meaning son of, also spelled Aben, Aven, Avin) to form a family name amongst Mizrahim who lived in the Eastern part of the Arab world. Among the best known of this formation are Ibn Aknin, Ibn Danan (hence Abendana), Ibn Latif, Ibn Migas, Ibn Verga. Those Jews who lived in the North Africa countries (especially Morocco) chose the use of the  word O or sometimes spelled "U" (belonging to), which created the names Ou'Hanna, (son of Hanna, also spelled Bohana, Abuhana, Abuhenna), O'Hayon (son of Life), O'Knine (son of Yacob, also spelled Waknin, Ouaknin).

The Arabic article al appears in quite a number of names, as in Al-Ḥarisi. Other names of interest, given by Steinschneider in a long list of eight hundred Arabic names in the Jewish Quarterly Review (ix. -xiii.), are Ghayyat (in Spanish Gayet), Ibn Danan and Ibn al-Dayyal, Al-Haruni ("the Aaronide", the same as Cohen), Ibn Waḳar, Ibn Zabara and Ibn Zimra, Ḥaji (applied to Karaites who had performed the pilgrimage to Jerusalem), Yaḥya (equivalent to John or Judah). Morel is said to be derived from Samuel; Molko means "royal"; Mas'ud is equivalent to Baruch; Muḳattil ("champion") would be a proper origin for the family name Mocatta; Najar and Najara refer to carpentry. The proper names Sa‘id, Saad, and Sa'dan are equally popular among Jews and Arabs. Abbas ("lion") corresponds to Judah, as Leo and the like in Europe.

Very many Judeo-Arabic names are compounded of 'abd ("servant"), as Abdallah and 'Abd al-Walid. Al-Faraj occurs as the name of the translator at Girgenti, and it is possibly the remote origin of the curious name of Admiral Farragut, whose grandfather came from Menorca. It is considered doubtful whether the name of the Ḳimḥis is Hebrew in that form, or whether it should be pronounced as an Arabic word, Ḳamḥi ("formed of wheat").

Sephardic Jews
Sephardic Jews in the Ottoman Empire were often known by multiple forms of their names, such as those in Ladino, Turkish, French, Hebrew, Arabic, and/or other European languages. Many were given names from the Bible.

Surname

Jews have historically used Hebrew patronymic names. In the Jewish patronymic system the first name is followed by either ben- or bat- ("son of" and "daughter of", respectively), and then the father's name. (Bar-, "son of" in Aramaic, is also seen.) Permanent family surnames exist today but only gained popularity among Sephardic Jews in Iberia as early as the 10th or 11th century and did not spread widely to the Ashkenazic Jews of Germany or Eastern Europe until the late 18th and mid 19th century, where the adoption of German surnames was imposed in exchange for Jewish emancipation.

Although Ashkenazi Jews now use European or modern-Hebrew surnames for everyday life, the Hebrew patronymic form is still used in Jewish religious and cultural life, and is common in Israel. It is used in synagogue and in documents in Jewish law such as the ketubah (marriage contract). Many Sephardic Jews used the Arabic "ibn" instead of "bat" or "ben" when it was the norm. The Spanish family Ibn Ezra is one example.

Many recent immigrants to Israel have changed their names to Hebrew ones, in a process called hebraization, to erase remnants of Diaspora history still present in family names from other languages. This is especially common among Ashkenazi Jews, because most of their European names do not go back far in history; surnames were imposed by the German and Austro-Hungarian Empires in the 18th century (explaining why many Ashkenazi Jews have German or European-sounding names).  The newly assumed Hebrew names were sometimes based on phonetic similarity with their former European surname, for example, Golda Meyersohn became Golda Meir.

A popular form to create a new family name is the false patronymic, using the prefix "ben" or "bar" followed by words who are not the name of a parent. Examples include patriotic themes, such as ben Ami ("son of my people"), or ben Artzi ("son of my country"), and terms related to the Israeli landscape, such as bar Ilan ("son of the trees", also similar phonetically to the bearer's original family name Berlin).  Another famous person who used a false patronymic is the first Israeli Prime Minister, David Ben-Gurion. His former family name was Grün, and he adopted the name "Ben-Gurion" ("son of Gurion"), not "Ben-Avigdor" (his father's name). Gurion was a Jewish leader in the period of the First Jewish–Roman War.

Change of name 

Change of name was not an unusual occurrence in Biblical times, if one may judge by the instances occurring among the Patriarchs, and it seems to have been not altogether unknown in later times. Thus, Moses Benveniste mentions a certain Obadiah who wandered from Germany to Turkey in 1654 and changed his name to Moses because the former name was unusual. Later in the Middle Ages a person who was dangerously sick would change his name in the hope that the Angel of Death, who summons persons by name, would be baffled thereby. This custom, known as meshanneh shem, is given in the Talmud and is mentioned by Judah Ḥasid. One of the names thus adopted was the appropriate one of Ḥayyim. In order to prevent any misunderstanding at the resurrection the cabalists later recommended persons to learn a psalm the first and last verses of which began and ended with the first and last letters of their names. Particular care is to be taken in the writing of names in legal documents, the slightest error in which invalidates them. Hence there are quite a number of monographs on names, both personal and geographical, the first of which was that written by Simḥah Cohen; the best known is that of Samuel ben Phoebus and Ephraim Zalman Margulies entitled Ṭib Giṭṭin. It was also common for Jews to change or adapt their name according to their place of living to make it easier to pronounce or to avoid discrimination, for example in the Soviet Union.

Superstitions

It was thought that Jews of the same name should not live in the same town or permit their children to marry into each other's families; this seems to have some reference to exogamy.  It is even urged that one should not marry a woman of the same name as one's mother; or that she should be required to change it. Even to the present day it is considered unlucky in Russia for a father-in-law to have the same name as the bridegroom. In other parts of Russia it is considered bad luck to name a child after a living relative. When several children have died in a family the next that is born has no name given to it, but is referred to as "Alter" (literally "old"), or Alterke, the view being that the Angel of Death, not knowing the name of the child, will not be able to seize it. When such a child attains the marriageable age, a new name, generally that of one of the Patriarchs, is given to it.  For a somewhat similar reason it is considered unlucky in Lithuania to call an only child by its true name.

Pen-names

Religious authors named by their works
It is customary for well-known authors, beginning with medieval times, to be known by the titles of their works rather than by their own names. Thus, Jacob ben Asher is referred to as the Ṭur or the Ba'al ha-Ṭurim; Joseph Caro is known as the Bet Yosef; and Ezekiel Landau as Noda' bi-Yehudah.

Acronyms used for religious authors
Even more frequently were authors known by contracted forms of their names, with the addition of some honorary prefix, as given above. Among contemporary Hebrew writers this practice is still more widely observed, though no honorary title is prefixed. A list is given by Moïse Schwab in his Repertoire.

Modern non-religious authors
Most Yiddish writers appear to prefer to write under some pen-name or pseudonym, and their example is at times followed by modern writers of Hebrew, though these, as a rule, prefer to give a name composed of their initials.

See also 
 Jewish surnames
 Hebrew name
 List of Jewish nobility
 Family name etymology
 German family name etymology
 Jewish Encyclopedia articles
 Polish surnames
 Zeved habat
 Hollekreisch
 Brit milah

References

Bibliography 
 

 G. Buchanan Gray, Hebrew Proper Names, London, 1898;
 T. Nöldeke, in Cheyne and Black, Encyc. Bibl. (with extensive bibliography). Talmudic: Schorr, in He-Ḥaluẓ, vol. ix.;
 Hirsch Perez Chajes, Beiträge zur Nordsemitischen Onomatologie;
 Bacher, in R. E. J. xiv. 42–47. Modern: Andræe, Zur Volkskunde der Juden, pp. 120–128;
 Zunz, Namen der Juden, in Ges. Schriften, ii. 1-82;
 Löw, Lebensalter, pp. 92–109;
 Orient, Lit. vi. 129–241; vii. 42, 620;
 Steinschneider, in Hebr. Bibl. pp. 556, 962;
 idem, in Z. D. M. G. xxxii. 91;
 Hyamson, Jewish Surnames, in Jewish Literary Annual, 1903, pp. 53–78;
 M. Sablatzky, Lexikon der Pseudonymen Hebr. Schriftsteller, Berdychev, 1902.
 What’s in a Name? 25 Jewish Stories. Jewish Museum of Switzerland, 2022, ISBN 978-3-907262-34-4

External links 
 List of Hebrew given names at Wiktionary
 GABIN List of Jewish surnames, from a Polish Business Directory
 Family Names of the Jews of Ethiopia - The Museum of the Jewish People at Beit Hatfutsot
 My Hebrew Name Database
 Origins of a number of Ashkenazi Jewish surnames

Name
 Name
 
Jewish society
Names by culture
Jewish genealogy